André Willy Petersson (born September 11, 1990) is a Swedish professional ice hockey player, who is currently playing under contract with HV71 of the Swedish Hockey League (SHL). He was selected by the Ottawa Senators in the 4th round (109th overall) of the 2008 NHL Entry Draft.

Playing career

Petersson has won the Swedish junior championship and the regular Swedish championship with HV71 in 2009 and 2010, respectively. He has twice played in the IIHF World U20 Championship and won the silver medal in 2009 and the bronze medal in 2010.

Petersson began the 2011–12 season in North America, playing with Ottawa's top farm team, the Binghamton Senators of the American Hockey League. He was called up to Ottawa on January 17, 2012, and made his National Hockey League debut on January 21 against the Anaheim Ducks. Petersson had a good first season with Binghamton, scoring 23 goals and 21 assists to place second on the team in scoring. As the 2012–13 season started with an NHL lockout and no NHL training camp, Petersson started with Binghamton and had 2 goals and 3 assists before injuring his hip and ending his season early.

On March 5, 2014, Petersson was traded by the Senators to the Anaheim Ducks in exchange for defenseman Alex Grant. He was immediately assigned to AHL affiliate, the Norfolk Admirals where he remained for the duration of the season.

On June 16, 2014, as a restricted free agent from the Ducks, Petersson opted to return to Europe in signing a one-year contract for Russian club, HC Sochi for their inaugural season.

After spending the 2017–18 season with Avangard Omsk, registering 10 goals and 27 points in 40 games, Petersson continued his career in the KHL by signing a one-year contract with Barys Astana on June 13, 2018.
He recorded a productive 23 goals and 45 points in 51 games for the Kazakh-based club in the 2018–19 season.

As a free agent, Petersson left Barys to sign a one-year contract to continue in the KHL with HC Dynamo Moscow on June 16, 2019. In the following 2019–20 season, Petersson added 17 goals and 39 points through 47 games. He led the team with 5 goals in their first-round victory over rivals Spartak Moscow before the remainder of the playoffs were cancelled due to the COVID-19 pandemic.

On 4 May 2020, Petersson as a free agent signed a two-year contract with his fifth KHL club, Lokomotiv Yaroslavl.

In the 2021–22 season, Petersson appeared in just 6 games with Lokomotiv before returning to former club, Dynamo Moscow, on 27 December 2021. He appeared in a further 2 regular season games before advancing to the playoffs with Dynamo. He posted 1 point through 6 playoff contests before leaving the club during their conference semifinals against CSKA Moscow due to the 2022 Russian invasion of Ukraine on March 16, 2022.

On 23 June 2022, Petersson opted to return to his original Swedish club, HV71 of the SHL, in agreeing to a three-year deal.

Career statistics

Regular season and playoffs

International

References

External links

1990 births
Avangard Omsk players
Barys Nur-Sultan players
Binghamton Senators players
Borås HC players
HC Dynamo Moscow players
HV71 players
Living people
Lokomotiv Yaroslavl players
Norfolk Admirals players
Ottawa Senators draft picks
Ottawa Senators players
People from Olofström Municipality
HC Sochi players
Swedish ice hockey right wingers
Sportspeople from Blekinge County